Pogoń Szczecin II is a Polish football team, which serves as the reserve side of Pogoń Szczecin. They compete in the III liga, the fourth division of Polish football. Participant of the 2001–02 Polish Cup, in which they were eliminated in the first round after a 1–3 defeat with Górnik Polkowice.

Notable former players 
Players who have been capped in their national teams
  Kacper Kozłowski

References

External links
 Pogoń Szczecin II at 90minut.pl 

 
Sport in Szczecin
Reserve team football in Poland